Helbah is a town of the tribe of Asher (Judg. 1:31), in the plain of Phoenicia.

"Asher did not drive out the inhabitants of Acco, or the inhabitants of Sidon, or of Ahlab, or of Achzib, or of Helbah, or of Aphik, or of Rehob; but the Asherites dwelt among the Canaanites, the inhabitants of the land; for they did not drive them out." (Judges 1:31-32 RSV)

Hebrew Bible cities